José Hierro del Real (born 3 April 1922 in Madrid, Spain – died 21 December 2002 in Madrid, Spain), sometimes colloquially called Pepe Hierro, was a Spanish poet. He belonged to the so-called postwar generation, within the rootless and existential poetry streams. He wrote for both Espadaña and Garcilaso magazines. In 1981, he received the Prince of Asturias Awards in Literature, in 1998 the Cervantes Prize and he received many more awards and honours.

Work 
 Alegría, M., Col. Adonáis, 1947 (Adonáis Prize 1947).
 Tierra sin nosotros, Santander, Proel, 1947.
 Con las piedras, con el viento, Santander, Proel, 1950.
 Quinta del 42, M., Editora Nacional, 1952.
 Antología, Santander, 1953 (with unpublished  poems. Premio Nacional de Literatura (National Literature Prize)).
 Estatuas yacentes, Santander, Beltrán de Heredia, 1955.
 Cuanto sé de mí, M., Ágora, 1957 (Criticism Prize).
 Poesías completas. 1944-1962, M., Giner, 1962.
 Libro de las alucinaciones, M., Editora Nacional, 1964 (Criticism Prize).
 Problemas del análisis del lenguaje moral (1970).
 Cuanto sé de mí, B., Seix Barral, 1974 (Full works).
 Quince días de vacaciones (1984), prose
 Reflexiones sobre mi posía (1984), essay
 Cabotaje (1989), compilation
 Agenda, M., Prensa de la ciudad, 1991.
 Prehistoria literaria, Santander, Artes Gráficas Gonzalo Bedia, 1991.
 Emblemas neurorradiológicos (1995)
 Sonetos, Ayuntamiento de Santa María de Cayón, Cantabria, 1995 (2nd edition increased, San Sebastián de los Reyes, Universidad Popular José Hierro, 1999).
 Cuaderno de Nueva York, M., Hiperión, 1998 (Premio Nacional de Literatura).
 Guardados en la sombra, Visor, (2002)
 José Hierro. Poesías completas (1947-2002), Madrid, Visor Libros, 2009.

Bibliography 
 Rogers, D. M.: «El tiempo en la poesía de J. Hierro» in Archivum, No. 1-2 (November 1961), pp. 201–230;
 Jiménez, J.O.: «La poesía de J. Hierro», in Cinco poetas del tiempo (Madrid, 1972), pp. 177–326;
 Villar, A. del: «El vitalismo alucinado de J. Hierro», in Arbor, No. 349 (January 1975), pp. 67–80;
 Peña, P. J. de la: Individuo y colectividad: el caso de J. Hierro (Valencia, 1978);
 Albornoz, A. de: José Hierro (Madrid. 1981);
 González, J.M.: Poesía española de posguerra: Celaya, Otero, Hierro (1950-1960) (Madrid, 1982);
 Torre, E. E. de: José Hierro: poeta de testimonio (Madrid, 1983);
 García de la Concha, V.: «Un poeta del tiempo histórico: J. Hierro», in La poesía española de 1935 a 1975 (Madrid, 1987), volume II, pp. 632–660;
 Corona Marzol, G.: Bibliografía de José Hierro (Zaragoza, 1988) y Realidad vital y realidad poética (Poesía y poética de J. Hierro) (Zaragoza, 1991);
 V.V. A.A.: A José Hierro. Encuentros. Domingo Nicolás (Ed.) Instituto de Estudios Almerienses. (Almería, 1999);
 V.V. A.A.: Espacio Hierro. Medio siglo de creación poética de José Hierro. Juan Antonio González Fuentes and Lorenzo Olivan (Eds.) Universidad de Cantabria. (Santander, 2001)
 Vierna, Fernando de: «La leyenda del almendro» in Exordio, No. 2 (Santander, 2003).

References

External links 
 José Hierro in Centro Virtual Cervantes
 Biblioteca Virtual Cervantes
 Premio Príncipe de Asturias de las Letras 1981

1922 births
2002 deaths
20th-century Spanish poets
20th-century Spanish male writers
Writers from Cantabria
Deaths from emphysema
Members of the Royal Spanish Academy
Premio Cervantes winners
People from Santander, Spain
Spanish male poets
Writers from Madrid